In the Name of Love: Artists United for Africa is a benefit album, recorded by Christian bands, with a portion of the proceeds going to help cure the AIDS pandemic in Africa. All of the songs are covers of U2 songs.

Track listing 
 "Sunday Bloody Sunday" – Pillar
 "Beautiful Day" – Sanctus Real
 "40" – Starfield
 "Love Is Blindness" – Sixpence None the Richer
 "Gloria" – Audio Adrenaline
 "Grace" – Nichole Nordeman
 "All I Want Is You" – Jars of Clay
 "Mysterious Ways" – tobyMac & Sarah Kelly
 "Pride (In the Name of Love)" – Delirious?
 "One" – Tait
 "With or Without You" – GRITS & Jadyn Maria
 "When Love Comes to Town" – Todd Agnew
 "Where the Streets Have No Name" – Chris Tomlin

Awards and nominations
In 2004, 'Beautiful Day' by Sanctus Real was nominated for a Dove Award for Modern Rock Song of the Year.

References

U2 tribute albums
2004 compilation albums
Charity albums